Jocara albimedialis is a species of snout moth. It is found in Mexico and Costa Rica.

Taxonomy
The name albimedialis is preoccupied by Jocara albimedialis.

References

Moths described in 1906
Jocara